Dato’ Seri Tunku Nadzaruddin ibni Almarhum Tuanku Ja’afar al-Haj (born 26 October 1959) is the third son of late Tuanku Jaafar of Negeri Sembilan.

Childhood 
Tunku Nadzaruddin was born at Kuala Lumpur, 26 October 1959 as the third son and youngest-born child of late Tuanku Ja’afar ibni al-Marhum Tuanku ‘Abdu’l Rahman, later Tuanku Jaafar of Negeri Sembilan, and his wife Tuanku Najihah binti Tunku Besar Burhanuddin (herself a member of the Royal House of Negeri Sembilan and much younger first cousin of her husband's father Tuanku Abdul Rahman of Negeri Sembilan).

His siblings are :
 Eldest sister Tunku Tan Sri Naquiah, Tunku Dara (26 December 1944)
 Eldest brother Tunku Dato' Seri Utama Naquiyuddin, Tunku Laksamana (8 March 1947)
 Elder brother Tunku Tan Sri Dato' Seri Imran, Tunku Muda of Serting (21 March 1949)
 Elder sister Tunku Puan Sri Jawahir, Tunku Putri (27 January 1952)
 Elder sister Tunku Dato' Seri Irinah (23 November 1957)

Education 
 St. Paul's Institution, and King George V School, Seremban, Malaysia
 Cheltenham College, Gloucestershire, United Kingdom
 University College, London, United Kingdom
 Middlesex University, United Kingdom (B.Sc.)

Wedding and family 
He married, at the National Palace, Kuala Lumpur, 6 November 1997, Y.M. Tunku Dato’ Sri Mimi Wahida binti Tunku ‘Abdu’llah Wahman (b. 14 June 1971), a former television personality, Dir Radin Technologies Sdn Bhd, daughter of Y.M. Raja ‘Abdu’llah Wahman bin Raja Sulaiman, by his wife, Y.M. Tunku Azimi binti Tunku Muhammad Yusuf, daughter of Commander Y.M. Datuk Tunku Muhammad Yusuf bin Tunku Nambul, of Jelebu. He has issue, two sons and one daughter:

 Tunku Muhammad Hazim Shah Raden bin Tunku Nadzaruddin. born at Damansara Specialist Hospital, Selangor, 23 September 1999.
 Tunku Muhammad Mish’al Raden bin Tunku Nadzaruddin. born at Damansara Specialist Hospital, Selangor, 30 April 2001.
 Tunku Ines Najihah Raden binti Tunku Nadzaruddin. born at Damansara Specialist Hospital, Selangor, 23 September 2003.

Honours of Nadzaruddin

He has been awarded :

Honours of Negeri Sembilan 
  :
  Recipient of the Royal Family Order of Yam Tuan Radin Sunnah (DKYR)
  Knight Grand Commander or Dato’ Sri Paduka of the Grand Order of Tuanku Ja’afar (SPTJ, 22.7.2000)
 CFP

Honours of Mimi Wahida

Honours of Negeri Sembilan 
  :
  Knight Grand Commander or Dato’ Sri Paduka of the Grand Order of Tuanku Ja’afar (SPTJ, 19.7.2003)

References 
 "Syarikat Pesaka Antah Sdn Bhd" Website, presentation of the Board of Directors with photo of Tunku Nadzaruddin

Royal House of Negeri Sembilan
Malaysian Muslims
Malaysian people of Malay descent
Malaysian people of Minangkabau descent
People from Kuala Lumpur
Living people
1959 births
People educated at Cheltenham College
Alumni of University College London
Alumni of Middlesex University
Sons of monarchs